Aydın Çıldır Airport  is an airport located southeast of the city of Aydın, in the Aydın Province of Turkey. DHMI has transferred the operation of this airport to Turkish Airlines for 20 years on 20 June 2012 after a public tender. Turkish Airlines Flight Academy operates a flying school since June 2013.

References

External links

http://www.airkule.com/haber/CILDIR-HAVAALANI-MUJDESI/11314
https://web.archive.org/web/20160304054927/http://www.dhmi.gov.tr/basinyayin.aspx?YayinID=2613

Airports in Turkey
Aydın
Buildings and structures in Aydın Province